Heliopetes leucola is a butterfly in the family Hesperiidae. It is found in Brazil in the states of Minas Gerais and Paraná.

References

Butterflies described in 1868
Pyrgini
Hesperiidae of South America
Taxa named by William Chapman Hewitson